Just Dropped In is a 1919 American short comedy film featuring Harold Lloyd.

Cast
 Harold Lloyd as The Boy
 Snub Pollard 
 Bebe Daniels  
 Mildred Forbes
 Estelle Harrison
 Wallace Howe
 Margaret Joslin
 Belle Mitchell
 William Petterson
 Noah Young

See also
 List of American films of 1919
 Harold Lloyd filmography

References

External links

1919 films
1919 short films
1919 comedy films
American silent short films
American black-and-white films
Silent American comedy films
Films directed by Hal Roach
American comedy short films
1910s American films